Sulaj is an Albanian surname. Notable people with it include:

 Agim Sulaj (born 1960), Italo-Albanian painter
 Agron Sulaj (1952–1996), Albanian footballer and coach

See also
 Sulak (disambiguation)

Albanian-language surnames